Burnside Township is the name of some places in the U.S. state of Pennsylvania:
Burnside Township, Centre County, Pennsylvania
Burnside Township, Clearfield County, Pennsylvania

Pennsylvania township disambiguation pages